Steven John Ashton (born February 29, 1956) is a British-born Canadian politician in Manitoba, Canada. He was a long-serving member of the Manitoba legislature, and was a long-time cabinet minister in the New Democratic Party governments of Gary Doer and Greg Selinger. He resigned from cabinet on December 22, 2014 to challenge Selinger for the leadership of the party. Ashton was eliminated from the race, after finishing last on the first ballot at the 2015 NDP leadership convention. Selinger was re-elected party leader on the second ballot. In 2017, Ashton ran for Manitoba NDP leader losing to Wab Kinew.

Early life
Ashton was born in Surrey, England, the son of John Stewart Ashton and Nedra May Childs. He moved with his family to Thompson, in northern Manitoba, at age eleven. He was educated at R.D. Parker Collegiate in that community, the University of Manitoba in Winnipeg and Lakehead University in Thunder Bay, Ontario. He was President of the University of Manitoba Students' Union in 1978-79 and has lectured in Economics for the former Inter Universities North in Thompson and Cross Lake.

Political career
Ashton was first elected to the Manitoba legislature in the 1981 provincial election, defeating Progressive Conservative incumbent Ken MacMaster by 72 votes in the constituency of Thompson. At the time of his first election, Ashton was involved in an INCO strike in the Thompson area as a member of the United Steelworkers of America. He was re-elected in the 1986 election by a greater margin.  Ashton did not serve in the cabinet of Howard Pawley.

The NDP were defeated in the provincial election of 1988, although Ashton won his own riding by a comfortable margin. He would later serve as House Leader for the NDP in opposition, and was easily re-elected in the provincial elections of 1990, 1995 and 1999. In 1995, he supported Lorne Nystrom's bid to lead the federal New Democratic Party.

Cabinet
When NDP leader Gary Doer became Premier of Manitoba in October 1999, Ashton was appointed Minister of Highways and Government Services. On July 4, 2000, he was charged with administration of the Gaming Control Act; his ministry was renamed as Transportation and Government Services on January 17, 2001. Following a cabinet shuffle on September 25, 2002, Ashton became Minister of Conservation (in which capacity he argued for national approval of the Kyoto Accord on climate change). On June 25, 2003, he was also made Minister of Labour and Immigration with responsibility for Multiculturalism and administration of the Worker's Compensation Act.

In 2003, Ashton supported Bill Blaikie's campaign to become leader of the federal NDP.

Ashton was re-elected in the 2003 election with over 82% of the vote in his constituency. On November 4, 2003, he was named as the province's first Minister of Water Stewardship (created after highly publicized water contamination tragedies in Walkerton, Ontario and North Battleford, Saskatchewan).

Ashton was re-elected in the 2007 provincial election and in September 2007 he was appointed Minister of Intergovernmental Affairs and Minister responsible for the Emergency Measures Organization.

On September 4, 2009, Ashton announced his candidacy to succeed Gary Doer as leader of the Manitoba NDP in the 2009 leadership election and ran on a platform advocating the party's return to its social justice and labour roots. Ashton placed second behind Greg Selinger with 34.2% of the vote.

Upon Greg Selinger's election as premier, Ashton was made Minister of Infrastructure and Transportation, with the added responsibilities of Emergency Measures and the administration of the Manitoba Lotteries Corporation Act. He is also the lead minister for Canada-Manitoba Infrastructure programs.

Ashton resigned from cabinet on December 22, 2014 in order to unsuccessfully challenge Selinger in the 2015 Manitoba NDP leadership election.

He returned to cabinet in April 2015 as Minister of Infrastructure and Transportation and Minister responsible for emergency measures.
 
Ashton's 35-year streak as a member of the legislature ended on April 19, 2016 when he was defeated by Progressive Conservative candidate Kelly Bindle in the 2016 provincial election.

In 2017, Ashton ran for Manitoba NDP leader losing to Wab Kinew.

Personal life
In 1979, Ashton married Hariklia "Hari" Dimitrakopoulou, and the couple have two children, Niki and Alexander. Niki is also a politician and is the federal NDP Member of Parliament for the riding of Churchill—Keewatinook Aski, while his son Alexander was elected chairman of the board of trustees for the School District of Mystery Lake.
Ashton is also Secretary of the Canadian Committee for the Restitution of the Parthenon Marbles, seeking the return of the treasured sculptures from Britain to Greece. He speaks Greek, and has written on the political culture of that nation.

Electoral results

2017 leadership convention

2015 leadership convention

First ballot

Ashton eliminated. Releases his delegates, did not publicly endorse another candidate

2009 leadership convention

Provincial results

|Progressive Conservative
|Chuck Shabe
| style="text-align:right;" |1,320
| style="text-align:right;" |22.51
| style="text-align:right;" |-7.36

|- style="background-color:white"
| style="text-align:right;" colspan=3 |Total valid votes
| style="text-align:right;" |5,865
| style="text-align:right;" |100.00
| style="text-align:right;" |
|- style="background-color:white"
| style="text-align:right;" colspan=3 |Rejected votes
| style="text-align:right;" |19
| style="text-align:right;" |
| style="text-align:right;" |
|- style="background-color:white"
| style="text-align:right;" colspan=3 |Turnout
| style="text-align:right;" |5,884
| style="text-align:right;" |54.87
| style="text-align:right;" |
|- style="background-color:white"
| style="text-align:right;" colspan=3 |Registered voters
| style="text-align:right;" |10,724
| style="text-align:right;" |
| style="text-align:right;" |

References

External links
Official Website

1956 births
Living people
New Democratic Party of Manitoba MLAs
Canadian Anglicans
People from Surrey
United Steelworkers people
People from Thompson, Manitoba
Lakehead University alumni
Members of the Executive Council of Manitoba
21st-century Canadian politicians